Taylor Thompson (born October 19, 1989) is a former American football tight end for the Tennessee Titans of the National Football League (NFL). He was drafted by the Titans in the fifth round (pick 145 overall) of the 2012 NFL Draft. He was released during minicamps on June 18, 2015. He played college football at Southern Methodist.

Early years
Thompson attended Prosper High School, where he was a multi-sport athlete excelling in Basketball, Baseball, Track and Football. Following his Junior year, Thompson was rated as a three-star recruit by Rivals.com and Scout.com. His senior year he was selected to the Texas All-State Team, both a Tight end and Defensive end. He was also selected to Dave Campbell's Super Team, ranked as the No. 1 tight end in Texas for the 2008 class, and All-Texas High School Team.

College career
Under head coach June Jones, Thompson was a 4-year starter at SMU. In his Sophomore season, he was awarded honorable mention All-C-USA following the season. He was selected to the First Team All-C-USA his junior and senior year. Thompson is currently ranked 6th all-time at SMU for sacks recorded, with 18.

Professional career 
The Tennessee Titans selected Thompson in the fifth round (145th overall). He was the eighth tight end selected during the 2012 NFL Draft. Under head coach Mike Munchak, Thompson joined tight ends Craig Stevens and Jared Cook. During his time in Tennessee, Thompson made multiple contributions on offense as well as special teams. In 2014, Thompson received his first NFL touchdown from quarterback Ryan Fitzpatrick. In 2015, the Titans waived Thompson during summer mini-camps following a right knee injury.

References

External links
 
 Tennessee Titans bio
 SMU Mustangs bio

1989 births
Living people
American football defensive ends
American football tight ends
People from Prosper, Texas
Players of American football from Texas
SMU Mustangs football players
Sportspeople from the Dallas–Fort Worth metroplex
Tennessee Titans players